Tarzan: Return to the Jungle is a 2002 platform game developed by Digital Eclipse and published by Activision for the Game Boy Advance. The game is based on the 2001–2003 animated television series The Legend of Tarzan.

Gameplay
The game is an action-platformer that bears similarities to the previous Tarzan game for the Game Boy Color. Tarzan begins the game as a child, growing into an adult in later stages in the game. With the additions of L and R buttons on the Game Boy Advance, combating enemies is now possible.

In contrast to the previous game, collecting bananas is no longer a requirement to complete a stage; they now act as currency, as typical of platforming titles, and should the player collect 50-100 bananas, they will be rewarded an extra life.

Plot
The villainous Queen La, a character from the television series, attempts to take over the jungle. Tarzan learns traversal and combat abilities from Terk as his younger self, journeys through the Lost City of Opar, and rescues dinosaur eggs from poachers to save the jungle.

Reception
The game has received generally positive reviews. GameSpy stated, "It [the game] never gets quite as fun or inventive as any of the Mario or Rayman platform games, but Tarzan: Return to the Jungle holds its own surprisingly well, and is a must-have for fans of its GBC predecessor". NintendoWorldReport stated, "This game is the perfect thing for kids who are Tarzan fans. It looks very good, plays and sounds pretty, and will keep someone occupied long enough for it to merit a rental, if you don’t want to spend $30 on a game that you won’t be playing much after you finish if off the first time".

References

External links
Disney's Tarzan: Return to the Jungle at MobyGames

2002 video games
Activision games
Tarzan video games
Game Boy Advance games
Game Boy Advance-only games
Platform games
Video games set in Africa
Digital Eclipse games
Video games based on adaptations
Video games based on animated television series
Video games based on television series
Video games developed in the United States